Here Comes the Dawn (/ ) is a 1998 Georgian film directed by Zaza Urushadze. It was Georgia's official Best Foreign Language Film submission at the 72nd Academy Awards, but did not manage to receive a nomination.

See also
 List of submissions to the 72nd Academy Awards for Best Foreign Language Film
 List of Georgian submissions for the Academy Award for Best Foreign Language Film

References

External links
 

1990s Georgian-language films
1998 films
1998 drama films
Films directed by Zaza Urushadze
Drama films from Georgia (country)